3615 code Père Noël ("3615 code Father Christmas", referring to a Minitel dialling number; also known as Deadly Games, Dial Code Santa Claus, Game Over, and Hide and Freak) is a 1989 French horror thriller film written and directed by René Manzor. It is noted for its similarities to the 1990 American film Home Alone, the makers of which Manzor once threatened with legal action on the grounds of plagiarism, alleging that they had "remade my movie."

Plot 

Thomas de Frémont, a child prodigy obsessed with tinkering and action films, lives in a secluded and high-tech castle with his widowed mother, Julie, his diabetic and partially blind grandfather, Papy, and his pet dog, J.R. On Christmas Eve, Thomas uses the Minitel to try and communicate with Santa Claus, and unknowingly makes contact with a local derelict who is using a public Minitel terminal. The deranged man claims to be Santa, and attempts to get Thomas to divulge his address; before their connection is severed, the vagrant learns that Thomas's mother manages a nearby Printemps.

While Thomas sets up a security system to record or capture Santa, the vagabond gets a job as a Santa at the Printemps, but is fired from it after Julie witnesses him slap a child who had accused him of not being the real Santa. The vagrant subsequently steals a Santa suit, paints his hair and beard white, and hitches a ride to Julie's home in the back of a delivery van, the driver of which he kills upon reaching the de Frémont residence. The man then murders Julie's groundskeeper and her chef, breaks into her home through the chimney, and stabs J.R. to death in front of Thomas, who is convinced that the intruder is an enraged Santa. What follows is a game of cat and mouse as Thomas uses his security system and booby traps, as well as an arsenal of makeshift weaponry, to defend his enfeebled grandfather and combat the trespasser, who has cut the telephone lines and trashed the only car; the man at one point catches Thomas, but then lets him go while declaring, "I win. You lose. Now... I'll go hide myself, and you'll be it. Okay?"

Julie, concerned over her calls home not getting through, phones the police, who send an officer to the castle to check on Thomas and Papy. The vagrant murders the policeman and recaptures Thomas, but the boy is saved when his grandfather manages to shoot his assailant with the dead officer's gun, with Julie arriving home seconds later to find a stunned Thomas standing over the killer's body, stammering, "It's my fault, Mom. I wanted to see Santa."

Cast

Release 

In 2018, the film had its North American premiere at the Fantastic Fest in Austin, Texas, after having been restored by American Genre Film Archive.

Reception 

René Manzor and Deadly Games won Best Director and Best Film, respectively, at the 1990 Fantafestival.

Virgile Dumez of aVoir-aLire commended the film's cast and direction while noting that, "despite some clumsiness, it remains one of the best representatives of what French cinema can offer when it dares to leave its comfort zone." John Squires of Bloody Disgusting gave Deadly Games a glowingly positive review, heaping praise on its setting, cinematography, the relationships between its characters, and its sinister villain before concluding, "Deadly Games doesn't shy away from going to nightmarish places, but it's also got that holiday warmth you just love to see in Christmas movies." Fellow Bloody Disgusting reviewer Meagan Navarro also enjoyed the film, writing, "One creepy Santa, some surprising peril for its young lead, and a heavy lean into the holiday setting makes for an unexpected new holiday favorite."

The "crazy and out-there" film was awarded a score of 6/10 by Jason Adams of JoBlo.com, who complimented its action set-pieces and its realistic child protagonist, writing, "Thomas may be a badass Rambo Jr. with some of the tricks up his sleeve, but the movie never lets you forget that he's also a child suffering real injuries and crying for his mom. It's a brutal but unique spin to this kind of horror flick, one that you can't believe the filmmakers actually went for." Peter Martin of Screen Anarchy offered high praise to Deadly Games, writing, "I was utterly bowled over with happiness. Sure, it's your standard clever kid vs Santa Claus home invasion tale (?!), made before Home Alone, but it's exceptionally smart, funny and kinda fiendish too. It's a great family action movie for families who hate the holidays." Rafael Motamayor of Polygon commended the "slasher horror" film's "emotional stakes" and how it "fluctuates between whimsy children's humor and horror, using the kid-friendly first half to lure you into the horrors to come."

See also 

 Internet homicide
 List of films featuring home invasions

References

External links 

 
 
 

1989 films
1989 horror films
1989 independent films
1989 thriller films
1980s chase films
1980s Christmas horror films
1980s coming-of-age films
1980s French films
1980s French-language films
1980s horror thriller films
1980s slasher films
Films about animal cruelty
Films about blind people
Films about children
Films about homelessness
Films about mass murder
Films about mother–son relationships
Films about security and surveillance
Films about single parent families
Films about widowhood
Films directed by René Manzor
Films set in 1989
Films set in castles
Films set in department stores
Films set in France
Films shot in France
Films with screenplays by René Manzor
French Christmas horror films
French coming-of-age films
French horror thriller films
French independent films
French slasher films
Home invasions in film
Santa Claus in film
Termination of employment in popular culture
Works about diabetes